Hu Shuhua (24 December 1886 – 17 June 1968) was a Chinese politician and educator.

Hu was a member of the 2nd, 3rd, 4th National Committee of the Chinese People's Political Consultative Conference.

Biography
Hu was born into a family of teachers in Chengguan Town of You County, Hunan, on December 24, 1886, during the Qing Empire. He attended Changsha Mingde School in 1903. In 1907, he was accepted to Imperial University of Peking (now Peking University) and graduated in 1911, where he majored in German language. After college, he taught at Hunan Higher Normal School and Changsha Mingde School. In 1903, he went to Germany to study at Technical University of Berlin by the expense of the government. In 1920, he joined the Kuomintang in Berlin.

Hu returned to China in 1922. He became the President of Hunan University in 1923. In 1924, he became a professor at National Wuchang University. He was appointed as Director of the Office of Education of Zhejiang government in 1925. In the Spring of 1926, he was factory director of Shanghai Steel Plant. In 1927, he served as factory director of Hanyang Arsenal.

In June 1929, he served as President of Tongji University. In 1931, he was elected legislator of Legislative Yuan.

In 1932, he served the President of Hunan University for the second time. He wrote the lyrics of Hunan University Song in 1933.

In August 1935, he served as President of Chongqing University, and held that office until July 1938. He wrote the lyrics of Chongqing University Song in 1936.

In November 1939, he was appointed President of Northwest University, and served until February 1941.

Hu served as President of Hunan University from September 1940 to August 1943, and again February 1945 to June 1949.

After the establishment of the People's Republic of China (PRC), he became a professor at University of Science and Technology Beijing.

He joined the Communist Party of China in 1961.

During the Cultural Revolution, he suffered political persecution and experienced mistreatment by the Red Guards.

Hu died in Beijing, on June 17, 1968.

References

1886 births
1968 deaths
Politicians from Zhuzhou
Peking University alumni
Technical University of Berlin alumni
Presidents of Hunan University
Presidents of Chongqing University
Presidents of Tongji University
Presidents of Northwest University (China)
Educators from Hunan
Victims of the Cultural Revolution
Republic of China politicians from Hunan
People's Republic of China politicians from Hunan
Academic staff of the University of Science and Technology Beijing
Members of the 1st Legislative Yuan